Hurricane Iwa, taken from the Hawaiian language name for the frigatebird (iwa, lit. "Thief"), was at the time the costliest hurricane to affect the state of Hawaii. Iwa was the twenty-third tropical storm and the twelfth and final hurricane of the 1982 Pacific hurricane season. It developed from an active trough of low pressure near the equator on November 19. The storm moved erratically northward until becoming a hurricane on November 23 when it began accelerating to the northeast in response to strong upper-level flow from the north.

The hurricane devastated the islands of Niihau, Kauai, and Oahu with wind gusts exceeding  and rough seas exceeding  in height. The first significant hurricane to hit the Hawaiian Islands since statehood in 1959, Iwa severely damaged or destroyed 2,345 buildings, including 1,927 houses, leaving 500 people homeless. Damage throughout the state totaled $312 million (1982 USD$,   USD). One person (Seaman Joseph Cantu of the U.S. Navy aboard the destroyer ship U.S.S. Goldsborough)was killed from the high seas, and three deaths were indirectly related to the hurricane's aftermath.

Meteorological history

A very active trough of low pressure persisted along the equator in the middle of November, with westerly surface winds and windspread convection located along the trough from 140° W to 140° E. An organized circulation developed near Palmyra Atoll on November 18, and steadily developed as it drifted westward.
The storm tracked slowly northward after forming and initially remained a weak tropical storm.

Shortly after becoming a hurricane, Iwa turned and accelerated to the northeast in response to strong upper level flow to its north. Its forward speed increased to 30 to 40 mph, and Iwa passed just north of the island of Kauai on November 23 (November 24 in UTC). After passing Hawaii, the convection of Iwa rapidly deteriorated as it gradually lost tropical characteristics.

Impact

The acceleration of the hurricane concentrated the energy of its swells, resulting in high waves and storm surge across the Hawaiian Islands, though primarily near the path of the center. It is estimated the storm surge reached eight feet (two meters) on the south coast of Kauai. The heaviest rainfall reported from the island chain was from the Intake Wainiha 1086 site, where  was measured. Possible tornadoes were reported in association with a rain squall in Oahu. Waves on the coast of Oahu reached 16.4 feet in height (3 m), and waves on southern Kauai surpassed  in height.

During the worst of the storm, 5,800 people were evacuated from shoreline areas of Kauai to temporary shelters. Strong waves sank or grounded several small vessels on the southwestern coast of Kauai, with 44 of the 45 boats at Port Allen being sunk. The worst of the damage from the hurricane occurred in Poipu, where the rough surf destroyed or severely damaged several exposed luxury hotels and condominiums. Elsewhere on the island, damage was greatest in areas where there was no protective barrier reef offshore. Several small aircraft were damaged at Lihue airport from the winds, including many overturned small planes. The winds destroyed several buildings across the island, including one of Kauai's oldest churches and a warehouse. Additionally, the winds destroyed the roof of a bank. Strong winds initially left the entire island of Kauai without power. Highway 56 on the east side of the island was obstructed by fallen telephone poles, forcing residents to drive on the unpaved, red dirt cane roads usually reserved for hauling sugar cane from the fields. Rising waters washed out multiple roads near the coastline. The strong winds destroyed nearly all papaya and banyan trees on the island. The hurricane destroyed or greatly damaged 1,907 homes on the island and caused minor damage to 2,983 others, leaving one-eighth of the island's homes unlivable.

Rough seas killed a person on a Navy Destroyer the USS Goldsborough DDG-20 in Pearl Harbor when the seaman hit a stanchion, with four others injured on the ship. One of the four injured was swept overboard two miles (three kilometers) from the harbor. Before the arrival of the hurricane, around 1,000 evacuated the low-lying coastline to shelters.
Rough waves destroyed four and damaged two deep-water communication cables between Oahu and Kauai. In Oahu, damage from wind and surf was heaviest on the southwest coast between Nānākuli and Mākaha. The storm surge washed sand into streets in Waikīkī and flooded cars in areas of basement parking. Wind damage was greatest in areas where winds blew from southerly directions off of mountains. The winds damaged several small aircraft and a Douglas DC-3 plane in Honolulu. Gusty winds shattered glass windows in the Honolulu International Airport, injuring several passengers. Some flights in and out of the Honolulu airport were delayed, while other domestic airports were temporarily closed. The passage of the hurricane damaged at least 6,391 homes, 21 hotels, and two condominium buildings on the island. Additionally, 418 buildings, including 30 businesses, were destroyed on Oahu.

Surf damage was reported throughout the Hawaiian islands. 120 people were treated for injuries, though most were minor. An estimated 500 people throughout Hawaii were left homeless due to the hurricane. Damage on the private island of Niihau was severe. An aerial survey indicated 20 homes were destroyed and 160 were damaged, indicating that the hurricane affected nearly all of the island's 226 residents. Reportedly no one was injured on Niihau. At the time, Hurricane Iwa was the costliest storm to hit the state of Hawaii, with damage totaling $312 million (1982 USD$,   USD).

Aftermath
Three days after Hurricane Iwa passed the state, Governor George Ariyoshi declared the islands of Kauai and Niihau as disaster areas and began filing papers for a federal disaster declaration. On November 28, five days after the hurricane struck, President Ronald Reagan declared the islands of Kauai, Niihau, and Oahu as a disaster area. The declaration allocated federal funds to aid the affected citizens. The state Department of Education decided to close all schools on Kauai indefinitely.

The thousands of residents without power celebrated Thanksgiving by cooking turkeys on outdoor grills or smokers. Army and Air Force planes delivered 20,000 Thanksgiving rations to the thousands left in temporary shelters. The United States military also airlifted generators to Kauai due to several days of power outages. By three weeks after the hurricane, utility crews restored power to nearly all major areas in Oahu, while 5,000 remained without power in Kauai. By around a month after the hurricane passed the island, utilities were restored to most of the entire island. All roads and highways were cleared, as well. One 25th Infantry Division soldier at Schofield Barracks died while cleaning up after the hurricane. Two people died in a traffic accident due to malfunctioning traffic lights. Following the storm, significant redevelopment occurred in Poipu, where the hurricane flooded areas several hundred feet inland. Hurricane Iniki struck the same area ten years later. Officials estimate a hurricane similar to Iwa striking Oahu in 1992 could cause up to $7.5 billion in damage (USD).

Retirement
The Central Pacific Hurricane Center retired the name Iwa subsequent to the storm and replaced it with Io. However, in 2007, the CPHC revised the four rotating lists of tropical cyclone names and replaced the name Io with Iona before it could be used. Iwa was the first retired hurricane in the Central Pacific since the modern system of using Hawaiian naming began in the early 1980s, and it remains one of only four to be retired as of 2015.

See also

 Hurricane Dot (1959)
 Hurricane Iniki
 Hurricane Lane (2018)
 List of Pacific hurricanes
 List of Hawaii hurricanes
 List of retired Pacific hurricane names

References

Iwa (1982)
Iwa (1982)
Iwa (1982)
Iwa (1982)
1982 in Hawaii
Iwa